Barbara Dolniak, nee Przyłucka (born 21 September 1960) is a Polish politician who currently serves as the Deputy Marshal of the Sejm of the Republic of Poland, a position she has held since 2015. She graduated with a law degree from the University of Silesia in Katowice. In her postgraduate studies, she graduated with a focus in European Union Law and Judicial Application. After graduating, Dolniak became a lawyer and a judge in the District Court of Katowice, and served in that role for 30 years.

She married Grzegorz Dolniak, who was a member of the Sejm for five years. He died on April 10, 2010, a casualty of the Tupolev Tu-154 crash. After his passing, Barbara started the "Sportowa Szansa" foundation in his honor, which provides scholarships to young athletes of Poland. In 2011, she ran for the Senate of Poland as an independent candidate. She finished second out of eight candidates with 34,890 votes, losing to Zbigniew Meres's 47,820 votes. In 2015, Dolniak ran for the Sejm as a member of the Modern party. She received 15,752 votes in the election, which was enough to earn her a spot on the Sejm.

After being elected to the Sejm, Dolniak was named a Deputy Marshal, and serves on the Committee on Justice and Human Rights. She had spoken out about proposed reforms to the National Council of the Judiciary, stating that while reforms are needed, having politicians choose judges rather than judges themselves is a step in the wrong direction.

Personal life
She was the wife of the politician Grzegorz Dolniak who died in 2010 in the crash of the Polish Tu-154 aircraft in Smolensk, Russia. She has a daughter, Patrycja, who works also as lawyer. She lives in Będzin.

References

1960 births
Living people
Deputy Marshals of the Sejm of the Third Polish Republic
Members of the Polish Sejm 2015–2019
Members of the Polish Sejm 2019–2023
Women members of the Sejm of the Republic of Poland
Modern (political party) politicians
People from Bytom
21st-century Polish women politicians